Mi pequeño gran hombre is a 2018 Mexican comedy film directed by Jorge Ramírez Suárez. The film premiered on 7 December 2018, and is stars Jorge Salinas, and Fernanda Castillo. It is and adaptation of the Argentine film Corazón de león directed by Marcos Carnevale. The plot revolves around the life of a successful lawyer, divorced, who knows a charming and charismatic man, although there is a detail with which he finds it difficult to deal: his small stature. The film has a budget of just over 4 million pesos, granted by the Comisión de Filmaciones del Estado de Jalisco. It is filmed in locations in the city of Guadalajara, Jalisco, including areas known as the Bar El Callejón de los Rumberos, the Centro Histórico de la Ciudad de México and beaches in Paseo Chapultepec.

Cast 
 Jorge Salinas as León Godoy
 Fernanda Castillo as Carla
 José Carriedo as Diego
 André Real as Fabio
 Silvia Pasquel as Adriana
 Arleth Terán as Corina

References

External links 
 

Mexican comedy films
2018 comedy films
2010s Mexican films